Villa Clara is one of the provinces of Cuba.  It is located in the central region of the island bordering with the Atlantic at north, Matanzas Province by west, Sancti Spiritus Province by east, and Cienfuegos Province on the South. Villa Clara shares with Cienfuegos and Sancti Spiritus on the south the Escambray Mountain Range. Its main cities are Santa Clara (the capital), Remedios, Sagua La Grande, Camajuani, Caibarién, Ranchuelo, Placetas, and Manicaragua.

History

Prior to 1976, the current provinces of Cienfuegos, Sancti Spíritus, and Villa Clara were all part of the now obsolete province of Las Villas, but Villa Clara is still referred some times just as "Las Villas" using the shorter old name. Santa Clara was the capital of historical Las Villas and still capital of Villa Clara province. That old name itself, Spanish for "The Cities", refers to the four original 16th and 17th-century cities founded in this vast territory: San Juan de los Remedios, Sancti Spíritus, Santísima Trinidad and Gloriosa Santa Clara.

During pre-Spanish settlement in Cuba, what now is Villa Clara province was populated by Taíno people with chieftains of Sabanaque (north west), Sabana (north east), and Cubanacan, literally "The Middle Land" in the center where Santa Clara city is located nowadays. In this region from the eastern landing point of the Spanish was where Columbus believed the "King of India" was living. 
 
In early colonial Cuba, historical province Las Villas was center to cattle industry but by the 18th and 19th centuries it had shifted to sugar production with a large concentration of mills. At the beginning of the 20th century it had the highest percentage of land farms (90%). In 1950 it was second to Havana in manufacturing establishments.

After Castro's revolution in the 1960s it still led in sugar production on the island, but in the late 80s and 90s after the collapse of the Soviet Union and lack of support thereof, most of the already inefficient mills were closed down, some of them disassembled, while others became museums. Only the most efficient mills are still producing sugar. Since then the province concentrated its efforts on building beach resorts.

The country's first transgender municipal delegate was elected in Villa Clara in early 2013. Adela Agustin Hernandez is a resident of the town of Caibarien and works as a nurse electrocardiogram specialist.

Economy

Sugar, the commodity that the Cuban economy once relied upon, was primarily based in the plains in the north of the province, and several large mills provided employment to many people. Now in the newly restructured Cuban economy, most of these mills have been abandoned and the economy is instead focused on newly built beach resorts in the north cays. Sugar and tobacco are still the two most important agricultural commodities of the province.

Geography
The northern coast of Villa Clara is dotted with numerous cays (part of the Sabana-Camaguey Archipelago), and there are many coral reefs, sandy beaches, and newly constructed touristic resorts.

The Cays are a capricious cluster of some 500 islands, strewn along a sea of varying shades of blues and greens off the northern coast of the central province of Villa Clara and close to the second largest coral barrier reef in the world. It is a tropical paradise with more than 17 km of fine-white sand beaches.

Villa Clara Cays, covering more than 77 844 hectares, are a veritable wildlife refuge and provide a habitat for some 248 species of plants. The most precious jewels are Cayo Las Brujas, Cayo Ensenachos and Cayo Santa Maria, renowned for their immaculate landscape of incredible beauty, with sugary-white sand beaches and crystal-clear waters, fringed by autochthonous vegetation and connected to Caibarien, a small fishing town on the Cuban mainland, by a 48 km causeway stretching over the sea -accorded an international prize for its harmonious combination of nature and engineering in an area declared a World Biosphere Reserve- thus enabling visitors to access the cays directly from Santa Clara City, site of the international airport. The causeway has a total of 46 bridges especially designed to allow the flow of sea water, therefore protecting both the biodiversity and sustainability of the area.

There are smaller airfields near most of the main towns, plus a small international terminal in Cayo Las Brujas for the operation of small and medium size charter aircraft.

Villa Clara Cays, located approximately 300 km from Havana, are part of the Jardines del Rey archipelago, the largest archipelago surrounding Cuba which extends 465 km along the northern coast of the country.

A site of legends, it is said that this island, maze of singular biodiversity, was once a haven for pirates and buccaneers ready to pounce on ship passing along Cuba's shores.

Cayo Las Brujas takes its name from an old legend about a young couple whose love was thwarted by a jealous uncle, who in turn is the namesake of another islet: Cayo Borracho, which means drunkard. The remains of the San Pascual, a ship that ran aground many years ago, can be observed a mile away from the cay. Built in San Francisco, California and launched in 1919, the ship evokes the presence of American writer Ernest Hemingway in the area. From its deck, Cuban painter Leopoldo Romañach found inspiration for some of his famous marine landscapes.

Cayo Ensenachos is the smallest of the three cays but is a refuge for 22 endemic plants and 39 wildlife species. Shaped like a horseshoe, the islet was originally an aboriginal settlement. The beach is always calm due to the position of the cay which prevents the large waves from hitting the shore with force.

Cayo Santa María is also known as the White Rose of Jardines del Rey. The cay was named after the flagship of Christopher Columbus's fleet on his maiden voyage to the New World. Legend has it that this strip of land -some 13 km long and 2 km in width - is said to be haunted by the spirit of Rosa Maria Coraje, a woman who hid aboard a ship in a desperate attempt to find both paradise and her beloved. She landed on the cay and managed to survive hiding in the marshes, among the mangroves and feeding on fish, until she finally discovered her dearly-loved in a neighboring cay.

Around Santa Clara, the land rises into the Alturas de Santa Clara. Villa Clara also has numerous lakes, which are used for both water sports and fishing. The largest Cuban river to drain into the Atlantic, Río Sagua la Grande, is also in Villa Clara province.

Municipalities 

Source: Population from 2004 Census. Area from 1976 municipal re-distribution.

Demographics
In 2004, the province of Villa Clara had a population of 817,070.

Notable residents
Marta Abreu, benefactress
Rolando Arrojo, baseball player
José Bernal, artist
Jose Braulio Aleman, general, Spanish–American War
Yandy Díaz, baseball player
Mario Garcia, newspaper and magazine designer, born in Placetas, Las Villa
Rubén González, pianist
Adela Hernández, Cuba's first transsexual municipal delegate
Liván Hernández, baseball player
Orlando Hernández, baseball player
Wifredo Lam, painter
Moraima Secada, singer

See also
Second National Front of Escambray

References

External links

Portal de Villa Clara (Spanish)
Cayo Santa Maria, Villa Clara, Cuba 
Cayo Ensenachos, Villa CLara, Cuba 
Interesting Places
Cayo Santa Maria Beach Resort, hotels and information

 
Provinces of Cuba
States and territories established in 1976